The 1994 Labour Party leadership election was held on 21 July 1994 after the sudden death of the incumbent leader, John Smith, on 12 May. Tony Blair won the leadership and became Prime Minister after winning the 1997 general election.

The election was the first held under the new leadership election rules that had been introduced in 1993, which included an element of one member, one vote. The poll for leader was held simultaneously with a deputy leadership vote.

Candidates
Margaret Beckett had been the Deputy Leader of the Labour Party, and following Smith's death was serving as acting leader; she was the first female Labour MP ever to stand for the leadership of the party (and remained the only such MP until Diane Abbott announced her candidacy for the 2010 leadership election). Tony Blair was, at the time of his candidature, the Shadow Home Secretary.

It has been widely speculated that Shadow Chancellor Gordon Brown did not stand due to a pact agreed with Blair at the Granita restaurant in Islington, North London. Shortly after John Smith's death, Roy Hattersley telephoned Blair and urged him to stand for the Party leadership. Blair informed Hattersley that he was worried about "hurting Gordon" to which Hattersley replied that he should tell Gordon Brown that there had been "a lot of people in the past who had wanted to be leader of the Labour Party and have come to terms with the fact that they weren't going to be" and that Brown would have to be part of a line that "goes back a very long way".

However, in a MORI poll conducted shortly after Smith's death among all Labour supporters, Mr Blair took 32 per cent, Mr Prescott 21 per cent, Mrs Beckett and Mr Brown 12 per cent each, and Mr Cook 7 per cent, suggesting that Brown had little chance of winning anyway.

Robin Cook, the Shadow Secretary of State for Trade and Industry stated that he would not run, as he did not believe he was attractive enough to the general electorate and that this would damage the party at the next election. John Prescott, who had stood at the 1992 deputy leadership election and lost to Beckett, stood again for both leader and deputy leader.

The "electoral college" system that had been introduced meant that the votes of members of affiliated groups (mostly trades unions), the members of constituency parties, and Labour MPs were all weighted equally.

 Margaret Beckett, incumbent Deputy Leader of the Labour Party, Member of Parliament for Derby South
 Tony Blair, Shadow Home Secretary, Member of Parliament for Sedgefield
 John Prescott, Shadow Secretary of State for Employment, Member of Parliament for Kingston upon Hull East

Result
:

Tony Blair won, and led the party to its first general election victory for twenty-three years at the 1997 Election. Prescott won the deputy leadership poll, and went on to become Deputy Prime Minister during Blair's premiership. Beckett would also serve both in the Shadow Cabinet and then the Cabinet throughout Blair's term as leader, eventually becoming the last of the three Foreign Secretaries of the Blair ministries.

The next leadership election to take place occurred when Blair resigned in June 2007; this election was won by Gordon Brown, who ran uncontested. The next contested election would be in 2010, when Brown resigned.

How each MP voted

Source

See also
1994 Labour Party deputy leadership election
Blair–Brown deal

Notes

References
 

1994
Labour Party leadership election
Labour Party leadership election
Tony Blair
Labour Party leadership election